Most Evil is an American forensics television program on Investigation Discovery, first aired in 2006, presented by forensic psychiatrist Dr. Michael H. Stone of Columbia University during the program's first three seasons, and by forensic psychologist Dr. Kris Mohandie during its fourth season. On the show, the presenter rates murderers on a scale of evil that Stone himself has developed. The show features profiles on various murderers, serial killers, and mass murderers of various degrees of psychopathy.

Episodes

Season 1 (2006)

Season 2 (2007–2007)

Season 3 (2008–2008)

Series return
On December 7, 2014, Investigation Discovery began airing new episodes with a new host, Dr. Kris Mohandie.

Season 4 (2014)

Scale and criminals
Stone researched hundreds of killers and their methods and motives to develop his hierarchy of "evil". The scale ranges from Category 1, those who kill in self-defense, to the Category 22, serial torturer-murderers. Dr. Stone described the categories of the scale in his book The Anatomy of Evil, published in 2009. In a follow-up book, The New Evil: Understanding the Emergence of Modern Violent Crime, published in 2019, he and co-author Dr. Gary Brucato, a clinical psychologist and researcher, break down the individual categories of the scale in detail.

Neurologists, psychologists, and other forensic psychiatrists are interviewed on the show in an attempt to examine and profile the minds of notorious killers. Partial re-enactments are shown along with news footage, evidence, and reports from locals. Neurological, environmental, and genetic factors are examined to help determine what drives a person to kill. Background history and pre-meditation are considered when placing an individual on the scale of evil. The show indirectly deals with the concepts of morality and ethics.

Only criminals profiled on the show to be included below

References

External links
Dr. Stone featured on Real Law Radio with Bob DiCello Real Law Radio is a legal news talk radio program.
Personality Disorders Institute

Review by Ellen Dendy

2000s American documentary television series
2006 American television series debuts
2008 American television series endings
Discovery Times original programming
English-language television shows
Investigation Discovery original programming
True crime television series
Discovery Channel original programming